Garry Begg is a Canadian politician, who was elected to the Legislative Assembly of British Columbia in the 2017 provincial election. He represents the electoral district of Surrey-Guildford as a member of the British Columbia New Democratic Party caucus.

He previously ran in the 2015 federal election as the federal New Democratic Party's candidate in Fleetwood—Port Kells, but was not elected. Prior to entering politics, Begg was an inspector with the Royal Canadian Mounted Police.

Electoral record

Provincial elections

Federal elections

References

British Columbia candidates for Member of Parliament
British Columbia New Democratic Party MLAs
Living people
New Democratic Party candidates for the Canadian House of Commons
People from Surrey, British Columbia
Royal Canadian Mounted Police officers
Year of birth missing (living people)